The New Avengers may refer to:

The New Avengers (TV series)
The New Avengers (comics)

See also
 The Avengers (disambiguation)